Ulotrichopus variegata is a moth of the  family Erebidae. It is found in Kenya, Malawi, Mozambique, South Africa (KwaZulu-Natal) and Tanzania.

References

Moths described in 1902
Ulotrichopus
Moths of Africa